Kedar Narsingh KC (born 4 April 1961) is a Nepali physician, politician and social worker, previously serving as the Director of the National Tuberculosis Center and the President of the Nepali Medical Association.

KC currently serves as the President of the Society for Democratic Thought, a think tank, as well as the President of B.P. Smriti Hospital both based in Kathmandu. The think tank holds routine conferences on pertinent political issues and advocates for human rights and establishment of rule of law. In addition, he also heads a nonprofit foundation, Yasodadevi Bhagawan Singh KC Memorial Trust, named after his parents. The foundation provides free medical equipment and essential medicines to underserved areas of Nepal and conducts free health clinics, awareness drives and sanitary campaigns.

Medical career 
KC is a former President of Nepal Medical Association.

He served as the Medical Superintendent at the Sundhara-based Central Jail, where he oversaw the care of French serial killer Charles Sobhraj, before being appointed as the Director of the National Tuberculosis Control Center in Thimi in 2016.

On November 13, 2019, KC stated that Nepal was set to miss the target of ending Tuberculosis by 2035. Dr. KC blamed the government for failing to implement strategies stating, “Our government has signed almost every international commitment but it does little to implement them. If immediate intervention measures are not taken, we can witness a catastrophic condition in the next couple of years.”

Throughout his career, KC has hosted numerous health camps, where he provides free clinical services and distributes essential medicine to patients throughout Nepal.

Political career 
On November 18, 2018, KC along with other human rights activists issued an appeal to the parliament, National Human Rights Commission (NHRC) and UN Security Council stating that the perpetrators of human rights violation who succeeded in capturing the state power had been stalling the transitional justice process.

On 21 January 2022, following Minister for Infrastructure and Transport Renu Yadav's public threat of targeted killings of opponents, KC along with a group of activists issued a statement demanding that Prime Minister Sher Bahadur Deuba immediately sack Yadav from his cabinet and start legal proceedings against her.

References 

People from Nuwakot District
Tribhuvan University alumni
Nepali Congress politicians from Bagmati Province
Nepalese Hindus
1960 births
People of the Nepalese Civil War
Living people
Nepali Congress
Khas people
University of Rajshahi alumni
1961 births